S.I.O.S.O.S. Volume One is the debut album by American hip-hop group Spooks, released on February 8, 2000 by Antra, Artemis and Sony Music. The title is an initialism for "Spooks Is On Some Other Shit". The album launched the single "Things I've Seen", which charted at number 11 on Billboard's Hot Rap Singles chart and number 94 on the Hot R&B/Hip-Hop Singles & Tracks chart as well as went to number 1 in Europe and became the most played song internationally from 2001 to 2002. Spooks went gold in 5 countries and became eligible for a European platform plaque. Spooks eventually sold several million records.

Critical reception

S.I.O.S.O.S. garnered a mixed reception from music critics. Steve 'Flash' Juon of RapReviews found some songs of lesser quality and the rappers' voices to be nondescript, but gave praise to tracks like "Sweet Revenge", "Karma Hotel" and "Jungle House" for their haunting experimental beats and use of Ming Xia's vocals, concluding that: "Whether you buy into their claim that they represent a totally new direction in hip-hop or not, it's not hard to enjoy the positive aspects of this album - it's hip-hop, well done." A writer from Entertainment.ie also praised the group's mixture of hip hop and soul music with Ming Xia's chorus delivery, but was critical of their comedy skits and views on the music industry, concluding that: "If the Spooks cut out the foolery and focus on their musical talent, which on this evidence is considerable, they could go far." Jim Alexander of NME commended the Fugees and RZA influences found throughout the various tracks, and singled out the group's singer Ming Xia for "adding a touch of steely R&B modernism, a welcome female counterpoint, and enough hook-laden soul to catapult them into the big time." Vibe contributor Jon Caramanica said that despite Ming Xia's appearance throughout the record, he criticized the rappers traversing from different topics and styles as being "disorienting", concluding that: "S.I.O.S.O.S. compromises compelling parts that never yield a revolutionary whole." AllMusic editor Steve Kurutz said of the album: "S.I.O.S.O.S. (Spooks Is on Some Other Shit) is an eclectic mix of jazz, reggae, hip-hop, and neo-soul, and it's also not that good. Spooks consist of four gruff, male MCs and female singer Ming Xia, but five is truly a crowd and often the arrangements are so cluttered that the vocalists trip over themselves and interrupt each other like overeager grade-schoolers."

Track listing

 signifies a co-producer.

Sample credits
"Other Script" contains a sample of "Say It with Silence" written and performed by Hubert Laws.
"Safe House" contains an interpolation of "Calling You", written by Bob Telson, performed by Jevetta Steele.
"Something Fresh" contains an interpolation of "Mama Used to Say", written by Bob Carter and Norman Giscombe, performed by Junior.

Personnel
Adapted from the liner notes of S.I.O.S.O.S. Volume One.

Spooks
Booka-T
Hypno
Ming Xia
Vengeance
Water Water

Additional musicians
Dan Askew – guitar (track 12)
Rick Dahrouge – keyboards, guitar, bass (tracks 3, 11, 14)
Randy Feinberg – guitar (track 14)
Lawrence Griffith – bass (tracks 7 and 9)
Jay "Rock" Kulikowski – drums (tracks 3, 11, 14)
Pete Mitchell – drums (tracks 7, 9)
Vladimir Narcisse – keyboards (tracks 7, 9)
Irina M. Perez – keyboards (tracks 7, 11)
Charmel Rogers – guitar (tracks 7, 9)

Production
Jeff Abell – engineer, mixing engineer
Eric Agosto – assistant engineer (tracks 1, 2)
Al Boogie – engineer (tracks 12, 13)
Cheek – mixing engineer (track 3)
Daryl Dahrouge – engineer (tracks 3, 7, 9, 11, 14)
Greg Frentzen – assistant mixing engineer (track 3)
Herb Powers – mastering engineer
Tim Wayne – engineer (tracks 1, 2)

Artwork
Toupee – art direction and design
James Hicks – photography

References

External links

2000 debut albums
Spooks (group) albums